Béla Szende de Keresztes (born as Béla Frummer on 4 May 1823, Lugoj – 18 August 1882) was a Hungarian politician, who served as Minister of Defence from 15 December 1872 until his death.

As a soldier he took part in the Hungarian Revolution of 1848. After the defeat of the revolution he dealt with farming on his possession of Gavosdia.

After the Austro-Hungarian Compromise of 1867 he worked for the Ministry of Defence as an advisor. József Szlávy appointed him as Minister of Defence, that position Szende kept until the end of his life.

References
 Magyar Életrajzi Lexikon

1823 births
1882 deaths
People from Lugoj
Defence ministers of Hungary